Fatou station is a station on Line 7 of the Beijing Subway. It was opened on December 30, 2018.

The station is located in Chaoyang District outside the Southeast 4th Ring Road along South Fatou Road.

History
The station's platforms were completed on 28 December 2014, along with the rest of the initial section of Line 7, but, due to the need to clear space at the surface for station entrances, the station has remained unopened and trains pass through without stopping at Fatou.  In November 2017, the Beijing Municipal Commission of Housing and Urban Rural Development, and the Beijing Daily, both stated it expected the station to be operational by the end of 2018. It was opened on December 30, 2018.

Station layout 
The station has an underground island platform.

Exits 
There are 2 exits, lettered A and C. Exit C is accessible.

References

External links

Beijing Subway stations in Chaoyang District
Railway stations in China opened in 2018